John Bertram Adams (June 21, 1891 – June 24, 1940) was a professional baseball player in the early 20th century.

Adams died in 1940 at age 49 and was buried at Hollywood Forever Cemetery.

References

External links

1891 births
1940 deaths
Baseball players from Texas
People from Wharton, Texas
Major League Baseball catchers
Cleveland Naps players
Philadelphia Phillies players
Burials at Hollywood Forever Cemetery
Minor league baseball managers
San Antonio Bronchos players
Victoria Rosebuds players
Memphis Turtles players
New Orleans Pelicans (baseball) players
Seattle Rainiers players
Seattle Indians players
Dallas Steers players